Antal Odri (25 December 1900 – 15 January 1945) was a Hungarian sprinter. He competed in the men's 4 × 400 metres relay at the 1928 Summer Olympics.

References

1900 births
1945 deaths
Athletes (track and field) at the 1928 Summer Olympics
Hungarian male sprinters
Olympic athletes of Hungary
Place of birth missing